The Investigator is a quarterly magazine published by the Geelong Historical Society in March, June, September and December each year. The journal is named for the ship  of explorer Matthew Flinders, who was the first to set inside Port Phillip Bay and see the site of the future town of Geelong.

There is a cumulative index for 1965 - 1984 and an updated digitised index on CD from 1965 up to 2009. Issued from Vol. 1 no. 1: (Sep 1965) to date.  The Investigator includes articles on general history of Geelong and District, but also specialist research and history from a number of expert contributors including Norm Houghton an authority on timber tramways and sawmills of the district, and former engineer, the late Peter F. B. Alsop.

References

External links
 Official website

1965 establishments in Australia
Historiography of Australia
History magazines
Magazines established in 1965
Quarterly magazines published in Australia